Encore is the debut studio album by French electronic music record producer DJ Snake, released on 5 August 2016 by Interscope Records.

It features collaborations with Bipolar Sunshine, Skrillex, Yellow Claw, Justin Bieber, among others. The album garnered mixed reviews from critics. Encore debuted at number 8 on the Billboard 200 and spawned four singles: "Middle", "Talk", "Let Me Love You" and "The Half".

Singles
On October 16, 2015, Snake premiered the album's lead single, "Middle", which was written by William Grigahcine, Adio Joshua Marchant and Aaron Kleinstub, produced by DJ Snake and Aalias, and features vocals by English singer Bipolar Sunshine. The song was a huge success, reaching the top-twenty in France and the United States, as well as the top-ten and top-five in the United Kingdom and Australia.

"Talk", featuring Australian vocalist George Maple, written by Grigahcine, Jess Higgs, Harley Streten, Alex Burnett, James David, Chris Emerson, and produced by Snake, was released as the second single on 10 June 2016.

The third single, "Let Me Love You", featuring Justin Bieber, was released the same day as the album and reached the top-ten in 28 countries, including number four in the United States, number two in the United Kingdom and Australia and number one in many European countries such as France, Germany and Norway.

"The Half", featuring Jeremih, Young Thug and Swizz Beatz, was released on 7 February 2017, as the fourth single off the album. It was written by Grigahcine, Jeremy Felton, Jeffrey Lamar Williams, Kasseem Dean, Brittany Hazzard, and Jean-Baptiste Kouame, and produced by Snake and Free School.

Critical reception

Encore received generally positive reviews from music critics. At Metacritic, which assigns a normalized rating out of 100 to reviews from mainstream critics, the album received an average score of 62, based on 4 reviews.

Chuck Arnold from Entertainment Weekly praised the album for delivering on "sure-fire singles ("Middle", Sober")" while also displaying Snake's EDM credentials on the more "harder electronic assaults ("Sahara", "Propaganda"), saying that "Encore keeps the party rocking while barely missing a dance step." Ed Ledsham of Drowned in Sound said, "Overall, Encore is a worthwhile listen. It obviously suffers from many of the problems that dance music albums generally suffer from but it does well to show off Snake's ear for hooks just as well as his ear for drops." Will Hermes, writing for Rolling Stone, felt the featured guests were underutilized throughout the track listing, citing "The Half" and "Let Me Love You" as examples. Pitchfork editor Matthew Schnipper said that despite containing some banging earworms ("Sahara", "Ocho Cinco", "Propaganda"), the rest of the record falters when Snake overextends his talent to create a legitimate album filled with "ill-advised rap songs and bad ballads" concluding that, "[T]hey’re inoffensive, sure, but they’re completely unnecessary. Not sure what made him turn down."

Commercial performance 
In the United States, Encore debuted at number 8 on the Billboard 200, with 32,000 equivalent album units, marking DJ Snake's first top ten album. The album got over 16.9 million streams in its first week. Encore was DJ Snake's first album to debut at number one on the Billboard Top Dance/Electronic Albums.

Track listing

Charts

Weekly charts

Year-end charts

Certifications

References

2016 debut albums
DJ Snake albums
Albums produced by DJ Premier
Albums produced by Fraser T. Smith
Albums produced by Louis Bell
Interscope Records albums